Lost Horse Creek also known as Wild Horse Creek and Wildhorse Creek  is a stream in the U.S. state of Mississippi.

References

Bodies of water of Lauderdale County, Mississippi